The 1984 American League Championship Series matched the East Division champion Detroit Tigers against the West Division champion Kansas City Royals. The Tigers took the series in a three-game sweep to advance to the 1984 World Series against the San Diego Padres. The series was the 16th ALCS in all and the last to be played as a best-of-five. In 1985, the League Championship Series changed to a best-of-seven format.

Due to a strike by major league umpires, the series was played using local and collegiate umpires, with former AL umpire and league supervisor Bill Deegan working home plate for all three games.

Background
The 1984 American League Championship Series ended in a sweep by the Tigers, although Games 2 and 3 were both close.  Game 2 was decided in extra innings, and the Tigers clinched the pennant with a 1-0 victory in Game 3. It wasn't that surprising given the fact the Royals won 20 fewer games during the season and had won the AL West by a mere three games over both the California Angels and Minnesota Twins.

The striking umpires originally scheduled to work the ALCS were Marty Springstead (crew chief), Don Denkinger, Steve Palermo, Ken Kaiser, Greg Kosc and John Shulock (who was not a member of the Major League Umpires Association since he was hired by the AL during the 1979 MLUA strike).

Summary

Detroit Tigers vs. Kansas City Royals

Game summaries

Game 1
Tuesday, October 2, 1984, at Royals Stadium in Kansas City, Missouri

Game 1 was a blowout in Kansas City, as the Tigers struck first when Lou Whitaker singled to lead off the game off of Bud Black, then scored on Alan Trammell's triple. One out later, Lance Parrish's sacrifice fly made it 2–0 Tigers. Leadoff home runs by Larry Herndon in the fourth and Trammell in the fifth made it 4–0 Tigers. In the seventh, Royals' right fielder Pat Sheridan's error on Whitaker's line drive allowed him to reach second, then score on Trammell's single off of Mark Huismann. Tigers' Jack Morris pitched seven innings, allowing only one run in the seventh when Jorge Orta hit a leadoff triple and scored on Darryl Motley's groundout, with Willie Hernández pitching the final two innings. The Tigers added to their lead in the last two innings off of the Royals' bullpen. Barbaro Garbey led off the eighth with a single off of Huismann and scored on Darrell Evans's double, then Marty Castillo's RBI single made it 7–1 Tigers. Lance Parrish's leadoff home run in the ninth off of Mike Jones capped the scoring at 8–1 as the Tigers took a 1–0 series lead.

Game 2
Wednesday, October 3, 1984, at Royals Stadium in Kansas City, Missouri

The Tigers took Game 2 in extra innings by a 5–3 score. In the top of the first, Lou Whitaker reached on an error off of Bret Saberhagen, then back-to-back one-out RBI doubles by Kirk Gibson and Lance Parrish put the Tigers up 2–0. Gibson's home run in the third made it 3–0 Tigers. Dan Petry pitched seven innings and gave up two runs (on Jorge Orta's groundout in the fourth after a walk and single and Dane Iorg's RBI single in the seventh with two on), but lost his chance at a win when Willie Hernández surrendered the tying run in the eighth inning on Hal McRae's RBI double after a leadoff single. Detroit's "Senor Smoke", Aurelio López, held the Royals scoreless in the ninth, tenth and eleventh innings for the win. Johnny Grubb hit a double off Dan Quisenberry in the 11th inning to drive in Darrell Evans and Ruppert Jones for the game winning runs.

Game 3
Friday, October 5, 1984, at Tiger Stadium in Detroit, Michigan

The first postseason game at Tiger Stadium in 12 years was a pitcher's duel between Milt Wilcox and Charlie Leibrandt.  Leibrandt pitched a complete game, allowing only one run and three hits, while Wilcox gave up two hits and struck out eight Royals with Willie Hernández pitching the ninth inning for the save. Marty Castillo's 2nd inning groundout to drove in Chet Lemon for game's lone run as the Tigers completed the three-game sweep and advanced to the World Series. 

This was their first pennant in 16 years and the ninth in the team's history.

Had the ALCS gone the full five games, Game 5 on Sunday October 7, would have been a 1 p.m. ET time start instead of being in prime time. This would have happened because one of the presidential debates between Ronald Reagan and Walter Mondale was scheduled for that night. Accordingly, ABC planned to broadcast the debates instead of Game 5 in prime time.

Composite box
1984 ALCS (3–0): Detroit Tigers over Kansas City Royals

References

External links 
 1984 ALCS at Baseball-reference

American League Championship Series
American League Championship Series
Detroit Tigers postseason
Kansas City Royals postseason
American League Championship Series
American League Championship Series
1984 in Detroit
Baseball competitions in Detroit
20th century in Kansas City, Missouri
October 1984 sports events in the United States